Victoria Onetto (born June 26, 1973 in Buenos Aires) is an Argentine actress who worked in many soap operas and films.

Movies
 De mi barrio con amor (1995)
 Carlos Monzón, el segundo juicio (1996)
 El mundo contra mí (1996)
 La belleza de Helena (1997)
 Tesoro mío (1999)
 Balada del primer amor (1999)
 Chicos ricos (2000)
 El favor (2003)
 Peligrosa obsesión (2004)

TV
 Chicas y chicos (1986)
 Polenta (1987)
 Colorín colorado (1988)
 Calve de sol (1990)
 El árbol azul (1991)
 Princesa (1992)
 Buena pata (1993)
 Canto rodado (1993)
 Solo para parejas (1993)
 Alta comedia (1994)
 Marco el candidato (1994)
 Con alma de tango (1995)
 Nueve lunas (1995)
 Gino (1996)
 Archivo negro (1996)
 Poliladron (1997)
 Son o se hacen (1997)
 Verdad consecuencia (1998)
 Muñeca brava (1998–1999)
 Tiempofinal (2000)
 El sodero de mi vida (2001)
 Franco Buenaventura, el profe (2002)
 Son amores (2002)
 De la cama al living (2004)
 Conflictos en red (2005)
 La panadería de Don Felipe (2005)
 Un cortado (2006)
 Hechizada (2006)
 Bailando por un sueño 4 (2007)
 Un tiempo después (2008)
 ShowMatch (2009)
 Botineras (2010)
 Solamente vos (2013)

Unit
 Botines (2005)

Theater

 1995-1996: Don Fausto Protagónico, junto a Alberto de Mendoza, Danilo de Vizia y Perla Santalla. 
 1996-1997: Humores que matan.Protagonista. Junto a Oscar Martínez y Mercedes Morán.
 2000: La cena de los tontos.Protagonista. Junto a Adrián Suar y Guillermo Francella. 
 2002-2003: Pijamas.Protagonista. 
 2009: Closer.Protagonista, Junto a Mariano Martínez  
 2010: “El Arco del triunfo” Protagonista. Autor Pacho O'Donnell
 2011-2015 “La Mujer Justa” de Sándor Marài junto a Graciela Dufau y Arturo Bonín .
 2016: Relato de una mujer junto con Adriana Salonia, Celina Font y Emilia Claudeville.
 2017: Mujeres perfectas, musical con Lucila Gandolfo, Candela Vetrano, y Natalia Cociuffo.
 2017: Acaloradas, gira nacional con Patricia Echegoyen, Magui Bravi y Emilia Mazer. 
 2017: Postparto, junto a Laura Azcurra.
 2018: Locos de contento. Protagonista y productora.
 Don Fausto (1995–1996)
 Humores que matan (1996–1997)
 La cena de los tontos (2000)
 Pijamas (2002–2003)
 Closer (2009)
 Post Parto (2010) – not yet released

References

External links
 
 

1973 births
People from Buenos Aires
Argentine people of Italian descent
Argentine film actresses
Argentine stage actresses
Argentine television actresses
Argentine television personalities
Women television personalities
Argentine female dancers
Living people